Thikkurissy Sukumaran Nair (16 October 191611 March 1997) was an Indian poet, playwright, script writer, lyricist, orator, film director and actor, though he is best known as an actor in Malayalam cinema. He is the recipient of Padma Shri from the Government of India, which is one of the highest civilian honours in India. In a career that spanned about 47 years, he acted in over 700 films. He is considered to be the "First Superstar in Mollywood". In 1993, he was honoured with the J. C. Daniel Award, Kerala government's highest honour for contributions to Malayalam cinema.

Early life
Sukumaran Nair was born on 16 October 1916 in the village of Thikkurissy, Nagercoil, then part of Travancore. The village of Thikkurissy is now in Nanchilnadu, Nagercoil, Kanyakumari district, Tamil Nadu. He was born in an aristocratic Nair family to Mangat C. Govinda Pillai and N. Lekshmi Amma. He was a good writer and an orator even when he was doing his schooling in Marthandam Government Boys School. He wrote his first poem at the age of 8 and his poem was published for the first time when he was 14 in Dhakshina Bharathi. His poems were collectively published as a book named Kedavilakku when he was 20. His parents wanted him to secure a government job, but he launched his career in writing and arts even before he completed his studies. Incidentally, his sister L. Omanakkunjamma was the first female magistrate in India.

Career
He launched his career as a playwright. His plays Mareechika and Kalakaran were hugely successful. He then went on to write three more—Sthree, Maya and Sariyo Thetto—that revolutionised the professional play scenario in Malayalam. He replaced the melodramatic romantic musicals, which ruled the roost till then, with dialogue centred prose plays having themes of realism and social importance.

He entered the Malayalam film industry in 1950, which was in its early years with only about 10 films produced. He debuted in the industry with the film adaptation of his breakthrough play Sthree. He produced the film and played the protagonist as well. It failed to make much impact at the box office, the film scene in Kerala then being ruled by Tamil and Hindi films. Thikkurussy's next film Jeevitha Nouka (1951), produced by K and K Productions and directed by K. Vembu, was a turning point in Malayalam film history. It dealt with the theme of ego clashes in a joint family and was a big commercial success: It is touted as the first superhit in Malayalam film history. The success also made Thikkurissy the first superstar of Kerala. Jeevitha nouka was dubbed into four languages including Hindi. In 1952, he acted in Navalokam with a socially significant theme with Miss Kumari, who would later become the pet of the masses after the success of Neelakkuyil (1954). Navalokam did not make it big at the box office, but Thikkurissy cemented his superstardom with a big hit in the same year.

Visappinte Vili had Prem Nazir, then a novice. Thikkurissy coined Prem Nazir's screen name (his actual name was Abdul Khader). In 1953, another landmark of his, titled Sariyo Thetto, was released. It was a film adaptation of his play of the same name. Sariyo Thetto had him handling the story, screenplay, dialogues, lyrics and direction departments besides playing the pivotal role. With that Thikkurissy established himself as an inseparable element of Malayalam film industry. In 1968, he acted in the first full-length comedy film, Viruthan Shanku, directed by P. Venu. He was credited with lyrics, screenplay and direction in many films. The 13 films for which he was the lyricist includes Sthree, Palunku Paathram, Devasundari, Urvashi Bharathi, Poojapushpam and Balloon. He wrote story and screenplay for Muthalali and Aana Valarthiya Vanampadi. He directed the films Sariyo Thetto, Poojapushpam, Achante Bharya, Palunkupathram, Saraswati, Nurse and Urvashi Bharathi. His major acting ventures are Jeevithanauka, Navalokam, Visappinte Vili, Iruttinte Atmavu, Swayamvaram, Umma, Bhakthakuchela, Nadi, Thulabharam, Maya, Abhijathyam, Surveykkallu, Avanazhi and Aryan''.

Screen-naming
Thikkurussy coined screen-names of many actors in Malayalam cinema. Actors who were renamed by Thikkurissy include
Prem Nazir; actual name: Abdul Khader
S. J. Dev (stage actor and father of Rajan P. Dev); actual name: Devassia
Madhu; actual name: Madhavan Nair
Jose Prakash; actual name: K Baby Joseph
Bahadoor; actual name: Kunjali
Kuthiravattom Pappu; actual name: Padmadalakshan

Personal life
Thikkurissy married three times in his life. His first wife was Sarojini Kunjamma, daughter of Madhavan Unnithan, who belonged to a prominent family in Karuvatta, Alappuzha, known as Samudayathil. The couple has two daughters. The eldest, Shyamala Devi Kunjamma alias Lekha was an executive engineer in Ernakulam. Their second daughter Geethadevi Kunjamma is a housewife in Pujappura, Thiruvananthapuram. After parting ways with his first wife, Thikkurussy married play actor Ambalapuzha Meenakshy Amma. The couple had a son named Rajahamsan, who now lives in Chennai. The second marriage also didn't last long and Thikkurussy married K. Sulochana Devi, who was a singer and dancer. This marriage however was successful and lasted for more than four decades till his death. Thikkurissy had a daughter from this marriage named Kanakasree. She, like her father was interested in poetry and took name as a good poet. Thikkurussy had a personal tragedy when Kanakasree died due to a bike accident in 1989. During his final days, he suffered from many diseases owing to his advanced age. Finally, he died on 11 March 1997 aged 80 in Thiruvananthapuram, Kerala, due to kidney failure.

Awards
The major awards that he received are:

Padmashri from the Government of India − 1973
Filmfare Lifetime Achievement Award – South − 1986
Kerala State Film Award for Best Actor − 1972
J. C. Daniel Award (Kerala State Film Award for Lifetime Achievement) – 1995
Kerala Sangeetha Nataka Akademi Fellowship − 1983
Mannathu Padmanabhan Award − 1989
Film Readers Gallop-poll Award − 1963
All Kerala Social Service Association Award − 1971
Bombay Nirthya Sindhu Award − 1991
Guru Chengannur Award 1991
Prem Nazir Award − 1992
N.Krishna Pillai Award 1992
Palakkad Film Festival Award − 1995
Pushpasree Award − 1995
Bangalore Kalavedi Award − 1994
Film Critics Association Award − 1995
Kerala Kaumudhi Readers Club Award − 1994
Film Guidance Society Award − 1996
Government of India Emeritus Fellowship for Contribution in the field of Art and Literature From 1 April 1996 to 31 March 1998
Talents of Universities Creative Heights Award − 1996
Navachedhana Award − 1994
Soorya Award − 1994
Travancore Devaswam Board Award. – 1972
Sree Moolanagaram Fine Arts Society Award − 1997
Abhinaya Saamrat − 1991
Nataka Chakravarthy − 1991
Chalachithra Prathibha − 1993
Chalachithra Rathnam − 1994
Chalachithra Acharyan − 1994
Malayala Chalachithra Kulapathy 1994
Sarasadrutha Kavi − 1994
Kala Vibhooshan − 1994
Bheeshma Charya − 1994
Sarvakala Sarva Bhouman − 1994
Guru Karanavar − 1995
Kala Jyothi − 1996
Sarasa Vachaspathy − 1996
Sadasya Thilakan − 1996

Selected filmography

Direction
Urvashi Bharathi (1973)
Achante Bharya (1971)
Palunku Pathram (1970)
Saraswathi (1970)
Nurse (1969)
Poojapushpam (1969)
Sheriyo Thetto (1953)

Writing
Aana Valarthiyal Vanampadiyude Makan (1971)
Muthalali (1965)
Sabarimala Shri Ayyappan (1962)
Devasundari (1957)
Sthree (1950)
Kettinethinu Vaasanathailam
Urvashi Bharati

Acting
A full acting filmography list is available here.

1990s
Janadhipathyam (1997) as Maharaja
Kilukil Pambaramam (1997)
Mahathma (1996)
The King (1995)
Indian Military Intelligence (1995)
Sadharam (1995)
Commissioner (1994) as Kunjurama Kurup
Janam (1993) as old man
Akashadoothu (1993)
Midhunam (1993) as Kurup Master
Kaazhchakkppuram (1992) as Paramu Pillai
Advaitham (1992) as Parameswaran Nampoothiri
Kilikkum (1991) as Shop owner
Pookkalam Varavayi (1991) as Mutha Chan
Kalari (1991) as Ramesh and Rakesh's father
Kizhakkunarum Pakshi (1991) as Moorthy
Midhya (1990) as Muthachan
Nanma Niranjavan Sreenivasan(1990) as Madhavan Pillai
Purappad (1990)
Arhatha (1990) as Ashwathi's Grandfather
Aye Auto (1990) as Krishna Pillai
Dr. Pasupathy (1990) as Pappan's Grandfather
His Highness Abdullah (1990) as Mathilakathu Cheriyachan Thampuran
Kuruppinte Kanakku Pustakom (1990) as Panikkar

1980s
Ardham (1989) as Janardanan's Father
Innale (1989) as Ramachandran Nair
Oru Sayahnathinte Swapnam (1989) as Govinda Pillai
Varavelpu (1989) as 'Apal bandavan' Govindan Nair
Aryan (1988)
Mukunthetta Sumitra Vilikkunnu (1988) as Menon
Oru Muthassi Katha (1988)
Vellanakalude Nadu (1988) as Chandrashekharan Nair
Witness (1988) as Old Man
Avanazhi (1986) as Nampoothiri
Rareeram (1986) as Radha's Father
Sughamodevi (1986) as Sunny's Father
Azhiyatha Bandhangal (1985) as Thampi
Ee Thalamura Ingane (1985)
Anakkorumma (1985) as Minister
Attahaasam (1984)
Kudumbam Oru Swargam Bharya Oru Devatha (1984)
Ivide Thudangunnu (1984) as Adv. Balachandra Menon
Oodarathuammava Aalariyam (1984)
Oru Nimisham Tharu (1984)
Oru Sumangaliyude Katha (1984) as Yamuna's father
Ahagaaram (1983)
Balooon (1982) as Aravindaksha Menon
Ayudham (1982)
Ithum Oru Jeevitham (1982)
Ithu Njangalude Katha (1982) as Ramankutty's Uncle
Padayottam (1982) as Kolathiri Rajavu
Grihalakshmi (1981)
Sanchari (1981)
Thaalam Manasinte Thaalam (1981)
Valarthu Mrugangal (1981) as Circus Owner Madhavan
Adhikaram (1980) as P.K.P
Ambalavilakku (1980) as Ramavarmma
Paallattu Kunjikannan (1980)
Seetha (1980)
Swathu (1980)

1970s
Ajnatha Theerangal (1979)
Allauddinum Albhutha Vilakkum (1979) as Shehan Sha
Hridhayathinte Nirangal (1979)
Ini Ethra Sandhyakal (1979)
Iniyum Kaanaam (1979)
Mamangam (1979) as King of Valluvanadu
Manushiyan (1979)
Pennorumbettaal (1979)
Ponnil Kulicha Rathri (1979)
Prabhatha Sandhya (1979)
Pratheeksha (1979)
Puthiya Velicham (1979) as Lohithakshan Bhagavathar
Sayoojyam (1979)
Vaaleduthaven Vaalaal (1979)
Ashtamudi Kayal (1978)
Asthamayam (1978)
Avar Jeevikkunnu (1978)
Chakrayudham (1978)
Jayikkanaayi Janichavan (1978)
Kadathanattu Maakkam (1978)
Kalpa Vriksham (1978) as Sankaran Menon
Kanal Kattakal (1978) as Dr.Kumar
Kanyaka (1978)
Madanolsavam (1978) as Ambadi Rajasekharan Thampi
Madhurikkunna Rathri (1978)
Manooradham (1978)
Snehikkan Oru Pennu (1978)
Society Lady (1978)
Itha Oru Manushyan(1978)
Sundharimarude Swapnangal (1978)
Thacholy Ambu (1978)
Aparaajitha (1977)
Aparadhi (1977)
Samudram (1977) as College Principal
Chathur Vedam (1977)
Harsha Bhashpam (1977)
Kannappanunni (1977) as Kannappan Chekavar
Kavilamma (1977)
Kodiyettam (1977)
Manas Oru Mayil (1977)
Mini Mol (1977)
Niraparayum Nilavilakkum (1977)
Parivarthanam (1977)
Rathi Manmathan (1977)
Saghakkale Munottu (1977)
Satyavan Savithri (1977)
Soorya Kanthi (1977)
Thuruppu Gulam (1977)
Vishukkani (1977)
Yatheem (1977) as Mammali Sayivu
Abhinandanam (1976)
Amba Ambika Ambalika (1976)
Ammini Ammavan (1976)
Amrudha Vahini (1976) as Thampi
Appooppan (1976)
Chennai Valarthiya Kutty (1976)
Chirikudukka (1976) as Sadashivan Nair
Dheere Sameere Yamuna Theere (1976)
Kayamkulam Kochunniyude Maghan (1976)
Mailanum Mathevanum (1976)
Rajanganam (1976)
Romeo (1976)
Sarvekkalu (1976)
Seemantha Puthran (1976)
Sita Swayamvar (1976)
Sreemadh Bhagwad Geetha (1976)
Swimming Pool (1976)
Themmadi Vellappan (1976)
Vazhi Vilakku (1976)
Yaksha Gaanam (1976)
Aaranya Kaandum (1975)
Abhimanam (1975)
Alibaba and Forty-one Thieves (1975) as Ameer
Babu Mon (1975)
Bharya Illaatha Rathri (1975)
Chattambikkalyaani (1975) as Daivam Mathai
Cheenavala (1975) as Rana
Dharmakshetre Kurukshetre (1975)
Kalayana Sougandhikam (1975)
Kottaram Vilakkanundu (1975)
Manishada (1975)
Mattoru Seetha (1975)
Neela Ponman (1975) as Sankara Prabhu
Padmaragam (1975)
Sammanam (1975)
Sathyathinte Nizhalil (1975)
Soorya Vamsam (1975)
Swami Ayyappan (1975)
Swarna Matsyam (1975)
Thiruvonam (1975)
Thomashleeha (1975)
Ayalathe Sundari (1974)
Check Post (1974)
Devi Kanyakumari (1974)
Manyasree Viswamitran (1974)
Nadee Nadanmare Aavashyamunde (1974)
Nagaram Sagaram (1974)
Nathoon (1974)
Nellu (1974) as Chevara Perukki
Pancha Thanthram (1974)
Pattabhisekam (1974)
Saptha Swarangal (1974) as Govinda Panikkar
Suprabhatham (1974)
Swarna Vigraham (1974)
Thumbolarcha (1974) as Kannappa Chekavar
Vishnu Vijayam (1974)
Youvanam (1974)
Aasha Chakram (1973)
Angathattu (1973)
Chenda (1973)
Divyadharsanam (1973)
Jesus (1973)
Kaadu (1973/II) as Kattumooppan
Kattu Vitachavan (1973)
Kavitha (1973)
Nakhangal (1973)
Pacha Nottukal (1973)
Padmavyooham (1973)
Ponnapuram Kotta (1973)
Preathangalude Thazhvaram (1973)
Sasthram Jayichu Manushyan Thottu (1973) as Dr. Govinda Menon
Swarga Puthri (1973) as Mathai
Thaniniram (1973) as Gopalan Master
Thiruvabharanam (1973)
Urvashi Bharathi (1973)
Aaradi Manninte Janmi (1972)
Achanum Bappayum (1972)
Aromalunni (1972)
Maravil Thirivu Sookshikkuka (1972) as K. B. Menon
Maya (1972) as Decent Sankara Pilla
Professor (1972)
Sakthi (1972)
Sree Guruvayoorappan (1972)
Swayamvaram (1972)
Thavaputhalvan (1972)
Prathikaram (1972) as Pankajakshan Nair
Aabhijathyam (1971) as Shankara Menon
Aana Valarthiyal Vanampadiyude Makan (1971)
Makane Ninakku Vendi (1971) as Mamachan
Achante Bharya (1971)
Kalithozhi (1971)
Lanka Dahanam (1971)
Muthassi (1971)
Neethi (1971)
Puthanveedu (1971)
Amma Enna Stree (1970)
Cross Belt (1970) as Krishnan Thampi
Ezhuthatha Katha (1970)
Nazhikakallu (1970)
Nizhalattam (1970) as Karunakaran
Othenente Makan (1970)
Palunkupathram (1970)
Sabarimala Shri Dharmasastha (1970)
Saraswathi (1970)
Thara as Keshavankutty Nair
Triveni (1970) as Padmanabhan
Vivaham Swargathil (1970)
Nilakkatha Chalanangal (1970)

1960s
Aalmaram (1969)
Ballatha Pahayan (1969) as Beerankunju Hajiyar
Chattambi Kavala (1969)
Kumara Sambhavam (1969) as Himavat
Nadhi (1969) as Mattummel Thomachan
Nurse (1969)
Poojapushpam (1969)
Adyapika (1968)
Aparadhini (1968)
Hotel High Range (1968) as Rajasahib
Inspector (1968)
Kodungalluramma (1968)
Manaswini (1968)
Punnapra Vayalar (1968) as Maariyaveedan
Thulabharam (1968) as R.K.Menon
Vazhi Pizhacha Santhathy (1968)
Vidyarthi (1968)
Viruthan Shanku (1968)
Anveshichu Kandethiyilla (1967)
Chitra Mela (1967) as (segment "Apaswarangal")
Madatharuvi (1967)
Iruttinte Athmavu (1967) as  Madhavan Nair
Naadan Pennu (1967)
Pareeksha (1967) as Janardhanan Pilla
Post Man (1967)
Anarkali (1966) as Jaya Singhan
Iruttinde Athmavu (1966) as Karanavar
Jail (1966)
Kadamattathachan (1966)
Kallipennu (1966)
Kanaka Chilanga (1966)
Kanmanikal (1966)
Karuna (1966)
Kayamkulam Kochunni (1966) as Kunjunni Panikkar
Koottukar (1966)
Kusruthy Kuttan (1966)
Mayor Nair (1966)
Poocha Kanni (1966)
Priyathama (1966)
Puthri (1966) as Kunjachan
Tharavatamma (1966) as Keshavankutty
Tilottama (1966)
Bhoomiyile Malakha (1965)
Chettathi (1965)
Inapravugal (1965)
Jeevitha Yaathra (1965) as Parameshwara Kurup
Kaliyodum (1965)
Kathirunna Nikah (1965)
Kattu Pookkal (1965) as Thommachan
Kochumon (1965)
Mayavi (1965) as Krishna Menon
Muthalali (1965)
Odeyil Ninnu (1965) as Kuruppu
Rosy (1965)
Shakuntala (1965)
Atom Bomb (1964) as Kurungodu
Ayesha (1964)
Devaalayam (1964)
Kalanju Kittiya Thankam (1964) as Bhaskara Pilla
Karutha Kai (1964) as Thampi
Kudumbini (1964) as Raghava Kuruppu
Omanakuttan (1964)
School Master (1964) as Raman Pilla
Shree Guruvayoorappan (1964) as Villumangalam Swami
Thacholi Othenan (1964)
Chilamboli (1963)
Doctor (1963) as Madhava Menon
Kalayum Kaminiyum (1963)
Nithya Kanyaka (1963)
Sathyabhama (1963)
Snapaka Yohannan (1963) as Herodias Anthippas
Laila Majnu (1962)
Sabarimalai Shri Ayyappan (1962)
Shreekovil (1962)
Shree Rama Pattabhishekam (1962)
Snehadeepam (1962) as Sreedharan
Velu Thampi Dhalava (1962)
Viyarpintae Vila (1962)
Bhakta Kuchela (1961) as Kamsan
Christmas Rathri (1961) as George
Jnaanasundari(1961) as King Philip
Kandam Bacha Kotte (1961) as Alikoya Haji
Shri Sabarimalai Shri Ayyappan (1961)
Unniyarcha (1961) as Kannappa Chekavar
Poothali (1960)
Seeta (1960)
Umma (1960) as Abobacker Haji

1950s
Aana Valarthiyal Vanampady (1959)
Mariakutty (1958) as Pariyalle Kuruvachan
Randidangazhi (1958)
Atchanum Makanum (1957)
Devasundari (1957)
Thaskaraveeran (1957)
Atmarpanam (1956)
Harishchandra (1955)
Kalam Marunnu (1955)
Kidappadam (1954)
Puthradharmam (1954)
Sneehaseema (1954)
Ponkathir (1953)
Sheriyo Thetto (1953)
Achan (1952)
Amma (1952)
Andaman Kaithi (1952)
Visappinte Vili (1952)
Jeevitha Nouka (1951) as Soman
Navalokam (1951) as Kuruppu
Chandrika (1950)
Sasidharan (1950)
Sthree (1950)

Television
Lubdhan Lukose (Doordarshan)

References

External links
 http://en.msidb.org/displayProfile.php?category=actors&artist=Thikkurissi%20Sukumaran%20Nair&limit=268

People from Kanyakumari district
Indian male film actors
Recipients of the Padma Shri in arts
Male actors from Thiruvananthapuram
Kerala State Film Award winners
1997 deaths
1916 births
Malayalam film directors
Malayalam screenwriters
Malayalam-language dramatists and playwrights
Indian male stage actors
Male actors in Malayalam cinema
Film directors from Thiruvananthapuram
Screenwriters from Thiruvananthapuram
Malayalam-language lyricists
Malayalam poets
20th-century Indian male actors
20th-century Indian dramatists and playwrights
Malayalam-language writers
Indian male dramatists and playwrights
Indian male poets
Male actors from Tamil Nadu
Dramatists and playwrights from Tamil Nadu
20th-century Indian film directors
Dramatists and playwrights from Kerala
Poets from Tamil Nadu
People from Nagercoil
20th-century Indian male writers
20th-century Indian screenwriters
J. C. Daniel Award winners
Recipients of the Kerala Sangeetha Nataka Akademi Fellowship